Theodorico Haroldo de Oliveira (1 July 1937 – 12 June 1990), simply known as Haroldo, was a Brazilian footballer who played as a central defender.

Honours
Santos
Intercontinental Cup: 1963
Copa Libertadores: 1963
Taça Brasil: 1963, 1964
Torneio Rio – São Paulo: 1963
Campeonato Paulista: 1964

References

1937 births
1990 deaths
Footballers from Rio de Janeiro (city)
Brazilian footballers
Association football defenders
Olaria Atlético Clube players
Santos FC players
Esporte Clube XV de Novembro (Piracicaba) players